The Jumber Patiashvili – Unity is an electoral alliance in Georgia, formed by Unity and the Intellectuals League of Georgia. At the 2004 Georgian parliamentary election, the alliance won 2.4% of the popular vote.

Political party alliances in Georgia (country)